Acceleration Team Italy is the Italian team of Formula Acceleration 1, an international racing series. They are run by Team Ghinzani, owned by Piercarlo Ghinzani.

History

2014 season 
Drivers: Mirko Bortolotti

The team announced Mirko Bortolotti as their driver for the inaugural Formula Acceleration 1 season.

Drivers

Complete Formula Acceleration 1 Results

References 

Italy
National sports teams of Italy
Italian auto racing teams